Liam Mellows GAA is a Gaelic Athletic Association club located in Renmore, a suburb of Galway City, Ireland.  The club is primarily concerned with the game of hurling. The club is named after IRB member Liam Mellows.

On 12 November 2017, Liam Mellows reached their first Galway Senior Hurling Championship final since 1970 after defeating Cappataggle by 0-13 to 1-9 in Athenry. 
On 3 December 2017 they beat Gort to win the championship.

They were defeated by the All Ireland Champions Cuala in the semi final in Thurles.

Hurling Titles

 Connacht Senior Club Hurling Championships:
 1970, 
 Galway Senior Hurling Championships:
 1935, 1945, 1946, 1968, 1970, 2017
 Galway Minor Hurling Championship 
 1947, 2003

Notable players
Darragh Kerrigan 
David Collins
Tadhg Haran
Jimmy Hegarty
John Lee

References

External links
Official Site

Gaelic games clubs in County Galway
Hurling clubs in County Galway
Sport in Galway (city)